Bahik (also Romanized as Bahīk) is a village in Chahriq Rural District, Kuhsar District, Salmas County, West Azerbaijan Province, Iran. At the 2006 census, its population was 281, in 56 families.

Location
The village is located on the outskirts of the Iran-Turkey border and has, for centuries, served as a passage between Iran and Turkey. The village is located approximately 50 km northwest of the provincial capital of Urmia.

People
The village's inhabitants are mainly Kurds, particularly those of the Deri tribe who have lived here for more than five-centuries.

History
The "Village of Behik" is a protocol signed in Constantinople in 1913 which drew most of the Turco-Persian border. The agreement which was signed in the presence of Persian, Turkish, Russian, and English delegates stipulated that the village of Behik, in addition to a number of others, remain as a part of Persia, modern day Iran..

References

External links

 Protocol relating to the Delimitation of the Turco-Persian Boundary signed at Constantinople on November 4 1913
 "Behik, Iran" Falling Rain Genomics, Inc.

Populated places in Salmas County